Cisnormativity or cissexual assumption is the assumption that everyone is, or ought to be, cisgender. The term can further refer to a wider range of presumptions about gender assignment, such as the presumption of a gender binary, or expectations of conformity to gender roles even when transgender identities are otherwise acknowledged. Cisnormativity is a form of cisgenderism, an ideology which promotes various normative ideas about gender, to the invalidation of individuals' own gender identities, analogous to heterosexism or ableism.

Cisnormativity is widespread in society. It manifests in speech as a separation of cisgender and transgender people where cisgender individuals are considered "normal" and transgender people, an exception. Cisnormative legislation may require mental health diagnoses or sterilization as a precondition for legal recognition of a transgender person's gender identity, and cisnormativity in health care results in transgender people having difficulties finding clinicians who are competent in transgender health care, or being forced into sex-segregated spaces which they feel uncomfortable in. This further causes some transgender people to avoid medical care, or to avoid disclosing their transgender status to practitioners.

Cisnormativity is closely tied to heteronormativity. The combination of the two, termed hetero-cis-normativity, represents the societally dominant view that sex, gender, and sexual orientation are all congruent.

Definition
Transfeminist Julia Serano writes in Whipping Girl that "[cissexual assumption] occurs when a cissexual makes the common, albeit mistaken, assumption that the way they experience their physical and subconscious sexes […] applies to everyone else in the world". She argues that cisgender people "indiscriminately project" their experience of gender identity onto all others, "transforming cissexuality into a human attribute that is taken for granted". A 2009 article published in the Journal of the Association of Nurses in AIDS Care (JANAC) defines cisnormativity as "the expectation that all people are cissexual". The SAGE Encyclopedia of Trans Studies states that cisnormativity is "the presumption that most people do, or should, conform to the norms about gender assignment in their society". It elaborates: cisnormative' behavior varies depending on the gender norms in place within a given society. For example, in some societies, having only 'woman' and 'man' as gender categories would not be cisnormative".

A related concept is that of cisgenderism (also known as cissexism), defined by Erica Lennon and Brian J. Millster writing for Transgender Studies Quarterly as "the cultural and systemic ideology that denies, denigrates, or pathologizes self-identified gender identities that do not align with assigned gender at birth as well as resulting behavior, expression, and community". Cisgenderism was proposed as an alternative concept to transphobia, with the intention of drawing focus to a systemic ideology, rather than an individual "phobia". This draws from the earlier distinction between heterosexism and homophobia. According to The SAGE Encyclopedia, cisnormativity is one form of cisgenderism.

Consequences
According to the 2009 JANAC article, "Cisnormative assumptions are so prevalent that they are difficult at first to even recognize." Cisnormativity is present in the way cisgender people are addressed without qualification as "men" or "women", while trans individuals often are consistently referred to as trans men or women, regardless of context. That is, being cisgender is considered normal, while being trans requires clarification.

The SAGE Encyclopedia of Trans Studies cites as examples of cisnormativity in legislation laws mandating mental health diagnoses to receive gender-affirming treatments or to have one's gender legally recognized, and laws requiring a trans person to be sterilized before they can change their legal gender.

Health care
Health care providers often lack education and thus awareness about transgender topics, which causes them to be unprepared to treat transgender people. In 2015, 24% of transgender survey respondents in the United States reported having to educate health care providers about transgender health. Transgender people often feel unwelcome in sex-segregated wards or clinics, and some report being outright dismissed by doctors, or asked to seek help elsewhere, upon revealing that they are transgender. Past or anticipated experiences in cisnormative health care systems cause some transgender people to shy away from health care. According to the 2021 Trans Lives Survey report, 57% of respondents in the United Kingdom avoided seeing a doctor when ill. Some transgender people also avoid disclosing their transgender status to clinicians for fear of mistreatment; this may cause further problems due to inappropriate treatments, or from unintentional revelation of the patient's sex during examination.

Relationship with heteronormativity
Cisnormativity often appears together with heteronormativity. According to Judith Butler, the dominant view of gender assumes a "causal continuity among sex, gender, and desire". In 2012, sociologist Meredith Worthen coined the term hetero-cis-normativity for this phenomenon:

According to Worthen, hetero-cis-normativity is a model to explain antipathy towards LGBT people, and transphobia may be a symptom thereof.

See also
Gender essentialism
Trans erasure

References

Transgender studies